Clang Invasion is an animated television series produced for the Canadian children's programming channel YTV. It also aired on Canal Panda, Gloob, Nickelodeon, ABC Me and Pop. 26 episodes were produced.

Plot
Three alien robots, Rivet, Widgit and Socket, accidentally crashed their spaceship on a backyard tree on Earth. Human twins Robin and Daisy Harrison, and their pet dog Sam went to investigate the crash, where they encounter the robots. Not capable of returning to Planet Clang, the robots becomes friends with Robin and Daisy, made Sam speak by installing a voice box, and utilise a spectrum of gadgetry for their goals. The twins also have to keep the robots a secret. Before rivet widget and socket return to planet Clang.

Characters
Rivet: (voiced by Patrick McKenna) The captain of the spaceship, Rivet is a male robot and inventor that serves as a genius to the kids, offering them his inventions. He discovered information about Earth from its old commercial broadcasts into space.
Widgit: (voiced by Linda Kash) The spaceship's navigator and maintainer, Widgit is a female robot who performs poorly technologically compared to the other robots but sympathizes with living things. She can contact with any living thing after accidentally devouring one of Rivet's gadgets.
Socket: (voiced by Doug Hadders) The spaceship's security officer, Socket is a simpler robot, unlike the others. As an old robot, his parts frequently fall off, with Rivet reattaching back socket’s parts. His head also acts as an object storage.
Robin Harrison: (voiced by Julie Lemieux) A 7-year-old human boy and Daisy's twin brother, Robin thinks the arrival of the robots in his background is the best thing in his life.
Daisy Harrison: (voiced by Annick Obonsawin) A 7-year-old human girl and Robin's twin sister, Daisy isn't as wise as her age in contrast to him, despite believing the contrary.
Sam: (voiced by Brad Adamson) The Harrisons' dog, Sam was given a voice box on his collar from the robots in order to speak. He is talkative.

Episodes

The dates that follow are when the episodes were initially developed and released in Singapore and England and not when they debuted in Canada, which was over 3 years later.

1. Countdown to Desthruction / When Life Gives You Lemons -September 18th 2007

3. I, Giant Robot / Super Excellent Fantastical Man... and Daisy - September 20th 2007

5. Home a Clone / Pause and Order -September 23rd 2007

7. To Everything Learn, Learn, Learn / The Fluffy Kitten… of Death - September 29th 2007

9. The Road to Invention / Queen Bumble Bee - October 5th 2007

11. O Tannenbomb / Teleputty - October 8th 2007

13. Welcome to My Nightmare / Trick or Treat or Trick or Treat - October 15th 2007

15. Ace Up His Sleeve / The Fright Stuff - October 30th 2007

17. Hide and Seek and Destroy / Go Kart a Go-Go - November 2nd 
2007

19. Chicken-Pocalypse / The E.A.R.L. Files - November 5th 2007

21. Freaky Monday / You Can't Handle the Tooth - November 27th 2007

23. Oh Snow He Didn't / Total Eclipse of the Art - December 9th 2007

25. Close Encounters of the Love Kind / Completely Lost in Space - December 15th 2007

27. The Big Dance / Lemur Come Back to Me - January 8th 2008

29. Two Dads Are Better Than One / The Polar-Bear Express - January 14th 2008

31. Hail to the Chief / With Friends Like These - February 8th 2008

33. License to Drive / Bullyworth - February 29th 2008

35. Recycle, Reuse, Re-Boot / Say Cheese - March 8th 2008

37. Bring Your Parents to Work Day / The Grandma Illusion - March 17th 2008

39. Robin Boy Genius... Naaaaa / Back on the Clang Gang - March 24th 2008

41. To Air is Devine / Field of Mean - April 5th 2008

43. There Goes the Neighbourhoodistan / On the Run - April 27th 2008

45. Evolution Solution / To Sasquatch a Thief - May 13th 2008

47. A Kung Fu Star is Born / Citizen Lame - May 28th 2008

49. Alien Happy Fun Time Challenge / Living It Upgrade - June 5th 2008

50. April Fools …AAAh / Dazed and Com-pooched - July 17th 2008

Production
The series was originally going to be called Gizmo. The series was co-produced by Decode Entertainment, Agogo Entertainment and Scrawl Studios. DHX Media is the distributor.

References

External links

2000s Australian animated television series
2007 Australian television series debuts
2008 Australian television series endings
2000s Canadian animated television series
2007 Canadian television series debuts
2008 Canadian television series endings
2007 Singaporean television series debuts
2008 Singaporean television series endings
Australian children's animated action television series
Australian children's animated comic science fiction television series
Australian flash animated television series
Canadian children's animated action television series
Canadian children's animated comic science fiction television series
Canadian flash animated television series
Singaporean animated television series
English-language television shows
YTV (Canadian TV channel) original programming
Television series by DHX Media
Animated television series about children
Animated television series about robots